Jhungian is a village in Shaheed Bhagat Singh Nagar district, Punjab, India. The village is administrated by Sarpanch, an elected representative of the village.

Demography 
As of 2011, Jhungian has a total number of five houses, and a population of 16 (eight women and eight men), according to the report published by Census India in 2011. The literacy rate of Jhungian is 76.92%, higher than the state average of 75.84%. The population of children under the age of six years is three, which is 18.75% of the total population of Jhungian, and the child sex ratio is approximately 0 as compared to the Punjab state average of 846.

As per the report published by Census India in 2011, five people were engaged in work activities out of the total population of Jhungian which includes five males and zero females. According to census survey report 2011, 100% workers describe their work as main work and 0% workers are involved in marginal activity providing livelihood for less than six months.

Education 
KC Engineering College and Doaba Khalsa Trust Group Of Institutions are the nearest colleges.

List of schools nearby:
K.C. Public School, Nawanshahr
Gsss Haila, Haila
Baba Karam Singh Public School, Daulatpur
U.K. Model High School, Langroya

Transport 

See also 
List of villages in India

References

External links 
 Tourism of Punjab
 Census of Punjab
 Locality Based PINCode

Villages in Shaheed Bhagat Singh Nagar district